The Verienigung Erzgebirge (English: Ore Mountains Association) is a social and soccer team based in Warminster, Pennsylvania that currently competes in the United Soccer League of Pennsylvania, an amateur league recognized by USASA Region I. The club was founded by German American immigrants from the Erzgebirge region of eastern Germany in 1931 and is now home to many of their descendants.

History
The Vereinigung Erzgebirge were founding members of the USL of PA in 1959 along with 19 other teams. The team has played the Lamar Hunt U.S. Open Cup three times, 1991, 2002 and 2020.

Year-by-year

References

External links
Official Website

Association football clubs established in 1931
Soccer clubs in Pennsylvania
1931 establishments in Pennsylvania